French Lake, California located in Nevada County, was a California Gold Rush community, now uninhabited. It was located by a lake of the same name.

Reservoir

French Lake Reservoir, at an elevation of 7500’-6680’, is part of a string of lakes, including Bowman Lake, Sawmill Lake, and Faucherie Lake to the northwest, as well as Meadow Lake and Fordyce Lake to the southeast. French Lake Road, used by the Nevada Irrigation District and not available for public use, skirts the lake's northwest perimeter before heading east to Meadow Lake Road. An unsigned road near the lake's southeastern banks veers northeast to Meadow Lake Road above English Mountain's now uninhabited Baltimore Town and Summit City in unincorporated Nevada County.

History
Prior to the Maidu, French Lake was inhabited by the Martis people, a now extinct Native American tribe.  The Martis' Meadow Lake Petroglyphs (also known as 4-Nev-3) are a historical landmark.

In 1878, the world's first long-distance telephone line operated between French Lake and French Corral, California, 58 miles to the west, including the towns of North San Juan, and North Bloomfield on the phone route. The phone line was used to pass information regarding water flow from French Lake for post-California Gold Rush hydraulic mining.

References

External links
 Society of California Pioneers photo, ca. 1860-1870 at University of California Libraries

Former settlements in Nevada County, California
Mining communities of the California Gold Rush
Populated places in the Sierra Nevada (United States)
Former populated places in California